Kees van der Zalm (30 September 1901 – 25 December 1957) was a Dutch footballer. He played in three matches for the Netherlands national football team between 1927 and 1929.

References

External links
 
 
 

1901 births
1957 deaths
Dutch footballers
Netherlands international footballers
Footballers from The Hague
Association football midfielders